The 2018–19 Basketligan season was the 26th season of the Basketligan, the top tier basketball league on Sweden. Norrköping Dolphins were the defending champions.

Teams

Köping Stars and Wetterbygden Stars joined the league.

Regular season

League table

Results

Playoffs
The playoffs are played with a best-of-five format (1-1-1-1-1).

Bracket

Quarterfinals

|}

Semifinals
Seeded teams played legs 1, 3, 5 and 7 at home.

|}

Finals
Seeded team played legs 1, 3, 5 and 7 at home.

|}

Relegation playoffs
The ninth qualified and the runner-up of the Superettan played a double-legged playoff for a place in the next Basketligan season.

|}

Swedish clubs in European competitions

References

External links
Official Basketligan website

Basketligan seasons
Sweden
Basketligan